Edward Welbourne (1894–1966) was a Master of Emmanuel College, Cambridge.

Early life
Welbourne's early education began at a country school he later described as 'incredibly incompetent' but with a teacher who was able to inspire a lifelong love of learning. He entered Emmanuel College in 1912, performed exceptionally well in history and participated on the rowing team. He served in France in World War I, where he was injured and received the Military Cross for having carried out 'a number of dangerous reconnaissance missions under heavy fire and leading a raid with great courage and skill'.

After his return from the war, Welbourne's economic history dissertation won a trio of prestigious awards including the Thirlwall and Gladstone prizes.

Later life
Welbourne, once a tutor to Punjabi Muslim nationalist Rahmat Ali, personally arranged Ali's burial in Cambridge on 20 February 1951 after his death in the UK. The funeral expenses and other medical expenses were repaid by the High Commissioner for Pakistan in November 1953, after what was described as 'protracted correspondence' between the London office and relevant authorities in Pakistan.

References

1895 births
1966 deaths
Alumni of Emmanuel College, Cambridge
Masters of Emmanuel College, Cambridge